The Battle of the Pinal Mountains was one of many small battles to occur between Apache warriors and Spanish colonists. The exact date of the battle is unknown but happened on one day in mid June, 1788, in the Pinal Mountains of east central Arizona.

Battle
Beginning on May 31, 1788, to June 24, Captain Pablo Romero of the Spanish Army led a 208-man force of Sonoran troops that killed eleven Apache warriors and four women and children. Thirty-four Apache men, women and children were captured. The Apaches slain included a chieftain named Quilcho.

Romero's expedition recovered two captive Pimas from Tucson and eleven animals, with a loss of two men dead. The so-called highlight of this offensive was a battle in the Pinal Mountains. Ensign José Moraga with about ten men from their pack-train escort decided to scout ahead of the wagon train.

After scouting a little while in the extreme front on horseback, the force spotted and attacked a ranchería, protected by "no more than 100 enemies". After Moraga slayed one Apache himself in hand-to-hand combat, Captain Romero, commanding the main force, heard the firing and raced to the scene, arriving just before the battle ended where his men were skirmishing a bit. The Spaniards lost one man, but killed six Apache warriors.

Aftermath
Captain Romero evidently left straightaway after the expedition ended to report to the commandant of arms in Arizpe how well he had succeeded in his sweep across Apacheria, so the King of Spain granted him a commission. However, shortly thereafter, on June 30, a band of Apaches caught and killed him on the hill of San Borja between Sonora and Bacoachi. Thus, Romero did not live to see the king's commission granting him 2,400 pesos salary. Romero left a widow, Doña Luisa Bojórquez, and at least two sons.

See also
 Capture of Tucson (1846)
 Capture of Tucson (1862)
 Siege of Tubac
 American Indian Wars
 Apache Wars
 Navajo Wars

References
 Bancroft, Hubert Howe, 1888, History of Arizona and New Mexico, 1530–1888. The History Company, San Francisco.
 Cooper, Evelyn S., 1995, Tucson in Focus: The Buehman Studio. Arizona Historical Society, Tucson..
 Dobyns, Henry F., 1976, Spanish Colonial Tucson. University of Arizona Press, Tucson..
 Drachman, Roy P., 1999, From Cowtown to Desert Metropolis: Ninety Years of Arizona Memories. Whitewing Press, San Francisco..

Pinal
Pinal
Battles in Arizona
Pinal
Pinal
Apache–Mexico Wars
1788 in North America
1788 in New Spain